Leptosia hybrida, the hybrid wood white or hybrid spirit, is a butterfly in the family Pieridae. It is found in Guinea, Sierra Leone, Liberia, Ivory Coast, Ghana, Togo, Nigeria, Cameroon, Equatorial Guinea, Gabon, the Republic of the Congo, the Central African Republic, Angola, the Democratic Republic of the Congo, Uganda, Kenya, Tanzania and Zambia. The habitat consists of primary and riparian forest, including riverine vegetation that penetrates moist savanna.

The larvae feed on Capparis species.

Subspecies
Leptosia hybrida hybrida (Guinea, Sierra Leone, Liberia, Ivory Coast, Ghana, Togo, Nigeria, Cameroon, Equatorial Guinea, Gabon, Congo, Central African Republic, Angola, Democratic Republic of the Congo) 
Leptosia hybrida somereni Bernardi, 1959 (north-eastern Democratic Republic of the Congo, Uganda, western Kenya, Tanzania, Zambia)

References

Butterflies described in 1952
hybrida